Czesław Adam Siekierski (born 8 October 1952 in Stopnica) is a Polish politician and Member of the European Parliament (MEP) for the Lesser Poland Voivodship & Swietokrzyskie Voivodship with the Polish People's Party, part of the European People's Party. On 7 July 2014, Czesław Siekierski was elected Chair of the European Parliament's Committee on Agriculture and Rural Development.

Siekierski is a member of the Conference of Committee Chairs and Delegation for relations with Canada and a substitute for the Committee on Budgetary Control and Delegation for relations with the People's Republic of China.

Education
 1976: Master's in Engineering
 1986: Doctor of Economic-Agricultural Studies

Career
 since 1976: Lecturer at the Warsaw Agricultural University
 1994-1998: Director of the Foundation of Assistance Programmes for Agriculture (FAPA)
 1971-1977: Chairman of the Council of the University Union of Polish Students
 1981-1982: Head of the Chief Organising Section of the United Peasants' Party (ZSL)
 1999-2002: Secretary to the Chief Executive Committee of the Polish Peasants' Party (PSL)
 1986-1990: Regional councillor on the National Warsaw-Mokotów Council
 2001-2003: Secretary of State in the Ministry of Agriculture and Rural Development
 1997-2004: Member of Parliament of the Polish Republic
 1997-2001: Vice-Chairman of the Economic Committee
 2003-2004: Observer to the EP
 since 1978: Active member of the Association of Engineers and Agricultural Technicians (since 1977) and of the Polish Economic Society

Decorations
 1997: Knight's Cross of the Order of Poland Reborn

See also
 2004 European Parliament election in Poland

External links
 
 

1952 births
Living people
Polish People's Party MEPs
MEPs for Poland 2004
MEPs for Poland 2004–2009
MEPs for Poland 2009–2014
MEPs for Poland 2014–2019
Members of the Polish Sejm 1997–2001
Members of the Polish Sejm 2001–2005
Members of the Polish Sejm 2019–2023